Meroctenus is a genus of beetle in the family Carabidae first described by Gemminger & Harold in 1868.

Species 
Meroctenus contains the following ten species:
 Meroctenus crenulatus (Chaudoir, 1843)
 Meroctenus dabreui (Andrewes, 1924)
 Meroctenus exaratus (Dejean, 1829)
 Meroctenus mediocris (Andrewes, 1936)
 Meroctenus melanarius (Boheman, 1848)
 Meroctenus micans (Dejean, 1831)
 Meroctenus nigerianus Basilewsky, 1946
 Meroctenus penthicus (Jeannel, 1948)
 Meroctenus senegalensis (Dejean, 1829)
 Meroctenus usambaranus Basilewsky, 1948

References

Harpalinae